Średnia Krokiew (The Normal Krokiew, in Polish krokiew means rafter) is a ski jumping normal hill in Zakopane, Poland.

History
The hill was opened in 1950. It hosted 1962 FIS Nordic World Ski Championships on normal hill and one FIS Ski jumping World Cup event in 1980.

The official opening of the remodeled complex was July 9, 2021. The complex has been equipped with plastic mattings, artificial lighting, snowmaking system, changing rooms and training hall, and the four largest facilities with artificially frozen inrun tracks.

Competitions are held on the track both in winter and in summer. So in 2022, in October, the summer ski jumping championship starts.

References 

Ski jumping venues in Poland
Sport in Zakopane
Sports venues in Lesser Poland Voivodeship
Sports venues completed in 1950
1950 establishments in Poland